Valdastico  is a town in the province of Vicenza, Veneto, north-eastern Italy. It is east of SP350 road, on western ridge of the Sette Comuni plateau.

Twin towns
Valdastico is twinned with:

  Encantado, Rio Grande do Sul, Brazil

Sources

(Google Maps)

Cities and towns in Veneto